Yuanta Securities is a Taiwanese investment bank headquartered in Taipei City, Taiwan and is the subsidiary of Yuanta Financial Holdings . The firm provides clients with capital markets and financial advisory services, institutional brokerage and securities research.

Currently Yuanta Securities is the largest brokerage house in Taiwan and has about 12% of market share  in Taiwanese stock market.

History
The predecessors of Yuanta Securities include Yuanta Securities established in 1961, Core Pacific Securities and Polaris Securities established in 1988, and Fuhua Securities established in 1996.In 2000, Yuanta Securities and Core Pacific Securities merged into Yuanta Core Pacific Securities; in 2007, Yuanta Core Pacific Securities and Fuhua Securities were merged into Yuanta Securities; on April 1, 2012, Yuanta Securities and Polaris securities were merged into Yuanta Polaris Securities; in 2015, Yuanta Polaris Securities was renamed Yuanta Securities.

Although Yuanta Securities is now dominated by Yuanda Financial Holdings, after many mergers while Fuhua Securities is the surviving company.

Controversies
A board member of Yuanta Financial Holdings resigned in 2012 after his son, Justin Lee, was found to have drugged and raped many women.

References

Banks of Taiwan
Companies based in Taipei
Taiwanese brands